Polymorphous perversity is a psychoanalytic concept proposing the ability to gain sexual gratification outside socially normative sexual behaviors. Sigmund Freud used this term to describe the sexual disposition from infancy to about age five.

Freud's theory

Freud theorized that some are born with unfocused pleasure / libidinal drives, deriving pleasure from any part of the body. The objects and modes of pleasurable satisfaction are multifarious, directed at every object that might provide pleasure. Polymorphous perverse sexuality continues from infancy through about age five, progressing through three distinct developmental stages: the oral stage, anal stage, and genital / phallic stage. Only in subsequent developmental stages do children learn to constrain drives towards pleasure-satisfaction to socially accepted norms, culminating in adult heterosexual behavior focused on the genitals and reproduction or sublimations of the procreative drive.

Freud thought that during this stage of undifferentiated impulse for pleasure, incestuous and bisexual urges are normal. Lacking knowledge that certain modes of gratification are forbidden, the polymorphously perverse child seeks gratification wherever it occurs. In the earliest phase, the oral phase, the child forms a libidinal bond with the mother via the inherent pleasure gained from suckling at the breast.

For Freud, "perversion" is a non-judgmental term. He used it to designate behavior outside the socially acceptable norms of his era.

See also
 Oedipus complex
 Sexual fetishism
 Paraphilia

References
 Freud, Sigmund. The Standard Edition of the Complete Psychological Works of Sigmund Freud. Trans. James Strachey. 24 vols. London: Hogarth, 1953–74.

External links

Freudian psychology
Paraphilias
Psychoanalytic terminology
Sexual orientation and psychology
Sexual attraction
Sexual fetishism